Guanyin is a town in Zhenba County, Shaanxi province, China. , it administers Xiaonanhai Residential Community and the following 13 villages:
Dashichuan Village
Majiaying Village
Xingzihe Village
Chuhe Village
Sixi Village
Taoshuwan Village
Bajiaomiao Village
Tianjiaba Village
Qiaogou Village
Mijiaba Village
Jinzhenba Village
Xiaoligou Village
Jifeng Village

See also 
 List of township-level divisions of Shaanxi

References 

Township-level divisions of Shaanxi
Zhenba County